Mural is a 2011 Chinese film co-written, co-produced and directed by Gordon Chan, which stars Deng Chao, Sun Li, Yan Ni, Collin Chou, Zheng Shuang and Eric Tsang. It is directed by the same director who directed Painted Skin (2008). Both stories are drawn from Pu Songling's (1640–1715) collection of supernatural tales Strange Stories from a Chinese Studio.

Plot

Mural tells the story of Zhu Xiaolian, a poor scholar who travels to the capital to take an examination accompanied by his servant. Along the way they capture a thief. The thief, trying to escape, enters a temple.

While taking a break Zhu becomes distracted by a mural and enters into the fantasy land of fairies. He meets the fairies and encounters love and hate. Due to the strict regulations of no man being allowed in the fairy land created by the queen fairy, a war breaks out to drive the men away.

Cast
 Deng Chao as Zhu Xiaolian
 Sun Li as Shaoyao
 Yan Ni as The Aunt
 Collin Chou as Meng Longtan
 Zheng Shuang as Mudan
 Eric Tsang as Monk Budong (guest star)
 Andy On as Golden Warrior
 Monica Mok as Ding Xiang
 Ada Liu as fairy Yunmei
 Bao Wenjing as Baihe
 Xia Yiyao as Xuelian
 Bao Beier as Hou Xia, Zhu's servant
 Du Shiwu as housekeeper
 Xie Nan as Fairy Cuizhu

Theme music
The title song for the movie is also named "Mural". The singers are Deng Chao and Betty Sun.

Accolades
Zheng Shuang won the Best New Actress award at the Hong Kong Film Directors' Guild Award for her performance.

Trivia
Deng Chao and Betty Sun who played the roles of hero and heroine in the movie was in fact married in 2010, shortly before the movie was filmed. The couple's first child was born in 2011, shortly after the movie was released.

All of the fairies are named after flowers. Shaoyao is Chinese peony. Mudan is rock peony. Ding Xiang is cloves.

References

External links
 

2011 films
Hong Kong romantic fantasy films
Films directed by Gordon Chan
Chinese romantic fantasy films
2010s romantic fantasy films
Films based on Strange Stories from a Chinese Studio
Beijing Enlight Pictures films
2010s Hong Kong films